The 2014 Presidents Cup is the National Senior "B" Championship of Canada. This year's tournament is being hosted by the Tri-City Bandits and the West Coast Senior Lacrosse Association. The Senior B national championship will be played at the Poirier Sport & Leisure Complex in Coquitlam, British Columbia.

One team enters the tournament after an undefeated season; St. Albert Miners. After a perfect 16-0 regular season, the Miners swept their way to a Rocky Mountain Lacrosse League championship.

Event
On opening day, the second game of the tournament involving the St. Albert Miners and Akwesasne Outlawz was cancelled due to a lack of eligible players. St. Albert was declared winner by forfeit, 1-0. All players attending the event were required by the Canadian Lacrosse Association to complete an online course designed by the Canadian Centre for Ethics in Sport in order to compete.

Teams

(x) denotes a berth into the semifinals.

Schedule/Results
August 25
Kahnawake 8 - Tri-City 7
St. Albert 1 - Akwesasne 0 (forfeit)
Onondaga 14 - Six Nations 12
Nanaimo 8 - Tri-City 5

August 26
Six Nations 8 - St. Albert 10
Kahnawake 14 - Nanaimo 10
Akwesasne 7 - Onondaga 16
Tri-City 6 - St. Albert 8

August 27
Onondaga 10 - Kahnawake 11
Nanaimo 6 - St. Albert 20
Six Nations 9 - Kahnawake 8
Onondaga 11 - Tri-City 6
Nanaimo 8 - Akwesasne 3

August 28
Kahnawake 14 - Akwesasne 8
Six Nations 8 - Nanaimo 4
Onondaga 7 - St. Albert 6
Akwesasne 4 - Tri-City 20

August 29
Nanaimo 3 - Onondaga 13
Six Nations 14 - Akwesasne 9
St. Albert 6 - Kahnawake 9
Tri-City 7 - Six Nations 9

August 30
Semifinal: Kahnawake Mohawks 4, Six Nations Rivermen 8
Semifinal: Onondaga Redhawks 10, St. Albert Miners 8

August 31
Bronze Medal Game: Kahnawake Mohawks 5 - St. Albert Miners 7
Gold Medal Game: Onondaga Redhawks 9 -  Six Nations Rivermen 7

Statistics

Scoring leaders

Goalie leaders

Awards
Most Valuable Player: Lyle Thompson (Onondaga Redhawks)
First Team All-Stars
Goalie: Warren Hill, Six Nations
Defense: John Lintz, St. Albert; Jeremy Thompson, Onondaga
Offense: Nate Schmidt, St. Albert; Lyle Thompson, Onondaga; Caleb Wiles, Kahnawake
Second Team All-Stars
Goalie: Dave Marresse, St. Albert
Defense: Richard Cambrey, Tri-City; Jordan Cornfield, St. Albert
Offense: Steve Higgs, Nanaimo; Peter Jacobs, Kahnawake; Wayne VanEvery, Six Nations

References

External links
 Presidents' Cup official website 

Lacrosse competitions in Canada